The women's 200 metres event at the 2002 World Junior Championships in Athletics was held in Kingston, Jamaica, at National Stadium on 18 and 19 July.

Medalists

Results

Final
19 July
Wind: -0.2 m/s

Semifinals
19 July

Semifinal 1
Wind: +0.4 m/s

Semifinal 2
Wind: -0.1 m/s

Semifinal 3
Wind: -0.3 m/s

Heats
18 July

Heat 1
Wind: +1.6 m/s

Heat 2
Wind: +1.5 m/s

Heat 3
Wind: +1.4 m/s

Heat 4
Wind: +2.0 m/s

Heat 5
Wind: +1.6 m/s

Participation
According to an unofficial count, 35 athletes from 26 countries participated in the event.

References

200 metres
200 metres at the World Athletics U20 Championships